Live Loyal Die Rich is a mixtape by rapper Young Buck, hosted by DJ Crisis & Drumma Boy. The mixtape features exclusive tracks and freestyles from Young Buck with appearances by The Outlawz, All Star Cashville Prince, and more. It was released for digital download on January 24, 2012.

Background
Due to contract issues with G-Unit Records and a feud with label head 50 Cent, Young Buck couldn't release a new album. So with help from Drumma Boy and Drum Squad records, Buck got together and they released an official mixtape through Young Buck's record label Cashville Records and Drumma Boy's label Drum Squad Records. Live Loyal Die Rich is an official release from Young Buck since dropping Back On My Buck Shit Vol. 2: Change Of Plans back in 2010.

"I'm Ready Now" produced by Boss DeVito was the first track released off the mixtape along with the music video featuring Shannon Sanders on August 11, 2011.

"Touchdown" was the second single released off Live Loyal Die Rich, it featured an appearance from CTN. The music video was released on November 8, 2011.

"Go Loco" was the third and final single released off Live Loyal Die Rich before its release date on January 24, 2012. The music video was shot in Nashville's Elite Clothing store, with guest feature Tha City Paper and a cameo appearance from DJ Crisis. The video was released on November 24, 2011.

"No Place For Me" was the fourth single released off the mixtape. The music video was shot in Nashville and released April 11, 2012. The video was directed by Charlie P & BlackFlyMusic. It was the first music video released off Live Loyal Die Rich after its January 24 release.

"Dusted" was the fifth single released off the mixtape. The music video was shot in Nashville and released October 8, 2012. The video was directed by Charles M. Robinson. It was the second music video released off Live Loyal Die Rich after its January 24 release.

"Somethings Got Me On It" was the sixth single released off the mixtape. The music video for the song was released June 22, 2013. It was the third music video released off Live Loyal Die Rich after its January 24, 2012 release.

Track listing

References

External links 
 
 
 
 
 
 

2012 mixtape albums
Young Buck albums
Albums produced by Aone
Albums produced by Drumma Boy